The city of Union is the county seat of Union County, South Carolina, United States. The population was 8,393 at the 2010 census.  It is the principal city of the Union Micropolitan Statistical Area (population 28,961  according to 2010 Census), which includes all of Union County and which is further included in the greater Greenville-Spartanburg-Anderson, South Carolina Combined Statistical Area (population 1,266,995 according to the 2010 Census).

History
Both the city of Union and Union County received their names from the old Union Church that stood a short distance from the Monarch Mill. When it was first founded, the city of Union was known as Unionville; later the name was shortened to Union. The county's first white settlers came from Virginia in 1749. Union County's population grew the fastest between 1762 and the start of the Revolutionary War. Settlers built log cabins and cultivated tobacco, flax, corn and wheat. Union was one of the first towns settled in the area and was untouched during the Civil War because the Broad River flooded and turned Sherman’s troops away from the town.

Geography

Demographics

2020 census

As of the 2020 United States census, there were 8,174 people, 3,452 households, and 2,063 families residing in the city.

2000 census
As of the census of 2000, there were 8,793 people, 3,791 households, and 2,399 families residing in the city. The population density was 1,105.0 people per square mile (426.5/km2). There were 4,240 housing units at an average density of 532.9 per square mile (205.7/km2). The racial makeup of the city was 56.48% White, 42.12% African American, 0.24% Native American, 0.38% Asian, 0.01% Pacific Islander, 0.05% from other races, and 0.73% from two or more races. Hispanic or Latino of any race were 0.68% of the population.

There were 3,791 households, out of which 25.5% had children under the age of 18 living with them, 38.5% were married couples living together, 21.3% had a female householder with no husband present, and 36.7% were non-families. 33.7% of all households were made up of individuals, and 16.5% had someone living alone who was 65 years of age or older. The average household size was 2.28 and the average family size was 2.91.

In the city, the population was spread out, with 22.9% under the age of 18, 8.3% from 18 to 24, 25.6% from 25 to 44, 23.1% from 45 to 64, and 20.0% who were 65 years of age or older. The median age was 40 years. For every 100 females, there were 79.5 males. For every 100 females age 18 and over, there were 74.3 males.

The median income for a household in the city was $26,110, and the median income for a family was $34,714. Males had a median income of $29,071 versus $19,966 for females. The per capita income for the city was $16,175. About 17.6% of families and 20.8% of the population were below the poverty line, including 29.1% of those under age 18 and 15.3% of those age 65 or over.

Arts and Culture

Sites in Union listed on the National Register of Historic Places webpage for Union County include:

 Cedar Bluff
 Central Graded School
 Corinth Baptist Church
 Culp House
 Judge Thomas Dawkins House
 East Main Street-Douglass Heights Historic District
 Episcopal Church of the Nativity
 Fair Forest Hotel
 Herndon Terrace
 Gov. Thomas B. Jeter House
 Meng House
 Merridun
 South Street-South Church Street Historic District
 Union Community Hospital
 Union County Jail
 Union Downtown Historic District
 Union High School-Main Street Grammar School
 Nathaniel Gist House

Education
Union County Schools operates public schools.

For some time, the county had three high schools, Union Comprehensive High, Jonesville High, and Lockhart High. As of a council ruling, the three high schools have been consolidated. Jonesville High School and Lockhart High School were closed, and the students were reassigned to Union High School, which has been renamed Union County High School.

The city is also home to the University of South Carolina Union (USC Union), a satellite campus of the University of South Carolina. USC Union was founded in 1965 and is accredited by the Southern Association of Colleges and Schools.

Union has a public library, the Union County Carnegie Library. This Carnegie library provides services and resources for both the community and USC Union students. It was named 2009's Best Small Library in America by Library Journal.

Notable people
 Darrell Austin, former NFL player for New York Jets and Tampa Bay Buccaneers
 States Rights Gist, Confederate brigadier general during Civil War
 Elizabeth B. Grimball, theatrical producer, director, writer
 Willie Jeffries, legendary College Football Hall of Fame coach for South Carolina State University, Wichita State University, and Howard University
 Bob Jeter, NFL player for Green Bay Packers and Chicago Bears
 Henry "Rufe" Johnson, a Piedmont blues guitarist, pianist, singer and songwriter; born near, worked and died in Union
 Mona Lisa, R&B singer
 Cotton Owens, NASCAR driver
 John Jonathon Pratt, journalist and newspaper editor
 Clifford Ray, former professional basketball player for Golden State Warriors and Chicago Bulls
 Don Rhymer, former film writer and producer
 Jim Youngblood, former NFL linebacker for Los Angeles Rams #53
Shi Smith, NFL Wide Receiver for Carolina Panthers
Lester Oliver Bankhead (1912–1997), American architect, born in Union, South Carolina and active in Los Angeles, California

References

Further reading

External links

 City of Union

Cities in South Carolina
Cities in Union County, South Carolina
County seats in South Carolina